Portola High School most commonly refers to:

 Portola High School, located in Portola, California

 Portola High School (Irvine, California), located in Irvine, California

See Also 

 List of high schools in California